Antiguraleus abernethyi is a species of sea snail, a marine gastropod mollusk in the family Mangeliidae.

Description
The length of the shell attains 7 mm, its diameter 2.4 mm.

Distribution
This species occurs off Ninety Mile Beach, North Island, New Zealand

References

 Dell, Richard Kenneth. The archibenthal mollusca of New Zealand. Dominion Museum, 1956.
 Powell, A.W.B. 1979: New Zealand Mollusca: Marine, Land and Freshwater Shells, Collins, Auckland (p. 239)
 Spencer, H.G., Marshall, B.A. & Willan, R.C. (2009). Checklist of New Zealand living Mollusca. pp 196–219. in: Gordon, D.P. (ed.) New Zealand inventory of biodiversity. Volume one. Kingdom Animalia: Radiata, Lophotrochozoa, Deuterostomia. Canterbury University Press, Christchurch.

External links
 
  Tucker, J.K. 2004 Catalog of recent and fossil turrids (Mollusca: Gastropoda). Zootaxa 682:1-1295.

abernethyi
Gastropods described in 1956
Gastropods of New Zealand